The Shire of Ashburton is one of the four local government areas in the Pilbara region of Western Australia, covering an area of . It is named after the Ashburton River.

The shire's administration centre is in the town of Tom Price. It had a population of about 13,000 as at the 2016 Census, most of whom live in the mining towns or in nearby mining camps. Most of the land is taken up by pastoral leases or protected areas (including the Karijini National Park). Other than agriculture, industries important to Ashburton include mining, oil, natural gas, fishing, and tourism.

History

It was established on 27 May 1972 as the Shire of West Pilbara, formed by the amalgamation of the original Shire of Ashburton and the Shire of Tableland. The new shire was described at the time as "the largest workable shire in Australia". It was originally based at Onslow, with a second office at Wittenoom.

It originally had nine members divided into six wards, but by 1977 had one councillor for each of the five towns in the shire (Onslow, Pannawonica, Paraburdoo, Tom Price, Wittenoom) and four members for the rural areas of the shire.

It was renamed the Shire of Ashburton on 18 December 1987. The name was changed to provide more identity to the particular region and to discriminate from the Newman region, which is also referred to as the "West Pilbara".

It was decided to move the administration office from Onslow to the more centrally located town of Tom Price in January 1990, when the Shire's administration office was officially opened in Poinciana Street.

Wards
The Shire is divided into 6 Wards, 9 Councillors in total.

 Tom Price (3 Councillors)
 Paraburdoo (2 Councillors)
 Ashburton (1 Councillor)
 Onslow (1 Councillor)
 Pannawonica (1 Councillor)
 Tableland (1 Councillor)

Towns and localities
The towns and localities of the Shire of Ashburton with population and size figures based on the most recent Australian census:

Heritage-listed places

As of 2023, 84 places are heritage-listed in the Shire of Ashburton, of which six are on the State Register of Heritage Places, among them Nanutarra Station and Peedamulla Homestead.

References

Further reading
 (1993) Ashburton Shire - brief history, named Shire of Ashburton 18 Dec. 1987 with the main offices in Tom Price, crest described Shire of Ashburton directory, 1993, p. 13

External links
 

 
Ashburton